Bukit Chandu (Malay for Opium Hill) is a hill located in Kent Ridge in Singapore where the Battle of Bukit Chandu took place on 14 February 1942 during the Battle of Singapore in World War II.

Notable attractions
 Reflections at Bukit Chandu
 Kent Ridge Park

See also
 Battle of Pasir Panjang
 Reflections at Bukit Chandu

References

External links
 Official website of Reflections at Bukit Chandu

Places in Singapore
Hills of Singapore